Unlocking the Air and Other Stories is a 1996 collection of short stories by Ursula K. Le Guin. Like Searoad and Orsinian Tales, most of the included stories are neither science fiction nor fantasy. It was a finalist for the 1997 Pulitzer Prize for Fiction.

Contents 
"Half Past Four" (1987, The New Yorker)
"The Professor's Houses" (1982, The New Yorker)
"Ruby on the 67"
"Limberlost" (1989, Michigan Quarterly Review)
"The Creatures on My Mind" (1990, Harper's)
"Standing Ground" (1992, Ms.)
"The Spoons in the Basement" (1982, The New Yorker)
"Sunday in Summer in Seatown" (1995, Thirteenth Moon)
"In the Drought" (1993, Xanadu II)
"Ether, OR" (1995, Asimov's Science Fiction)
"Unlocking the Air" (1990, Playboy)
"A Child Bride" (1987, Terry's Universe, as "Kore 87")
"Climbing to the Moon" (1992, American Short Fiction)
"Daddy's Big Girl" (1987, Omni)
"Findings" (1992, Ox Head Press chapbook)
"Olders" (1995, Omni)
"The Wise Woman" (1995, The Sound of Writing (broadcast))
"The Poacher" (1992, Xanadu)

References
Notes

Bibliography

External links

Short story collections by Ursula K. Le Guin
1996 short story collections
HarperCollins books